Larrabee State Park is a public recreation area located on Samish Bay on the western side of Chuckanut Mountain,  south of the city of Bellingham, Washington. It was created in 1915 as Washington's first state park. It is managed by the Washington State Parks and Recreation Commission.

History 

In 1913, the governor of Washington, Ernest Lister, proposed establishing a park along Chuckanut Drive. He mentioned this idea to Bellingham businessman Charles Larrabee, who agreed to deed waterfront property he owned in the area for the purpose. He died in 1914, but his wife Frances made sure the deal went through to completion. The governor officially accepted the park on October 23, 1915. On November 22, 1915, Washington State Board of Park Commissioners formally accepted it as well, thus making it the first state park in Washington. Initially called Chuckanut State Park, the park's name was changed to Larrabee in 1923.

The park began as a place mainly used for picnicking and to access the beach. After a series of relatively unsuccessful caretakers and trouble from the Great Depression, the park was experiencing low attendance by the early 1930s. Things began to turn around in 1935 under the leadership of manager Dave Johnson, who spearheaded the effort to improve the park, rallying local organizations, schools, churches, and businesses to increase use of the park. In 1936, the Works Progress Administration provided US$30,000 in federal funding, leading to improvements such as playground equipment, a water system, and kitchen shelters.

The Larrabee family donated another 1500 acres in 1937, with neighboring landowners making additional contributions. Further developments were made, and the park continued to attract visitors, reaching a quarter million annual visitors by 1965.

Activities and amenities 

The park features a short walk down to a pebble beach with views onto Samish Bay and the San Juan Islands. Picnicking, boating, saltwater fishing, sailboarding, and beachcombing along  of saltwater shoreline are among the other recreational options. Two mountain lakes, Fragrance Lake and Lost Lake, offer freshwater fishing for hikers. The park also includes camping sites, an amphitheater, and large fields.

References

External links 

 Larrabee State Park Washington State Parks and Recreation Commission 
 Larrabee State Park Map Washington State Parks and Recreation Commission

Bellingham, Washington
State parks of Washington (state)
Parks in Whatcom County, Washington
1915 establishments in Washington (state)